Joseph Raymond Gerald "Gerry" Ouellette (August 14, 1934 – June 25, 1975) was a Canadian sport shooter and Olympic champion. He was born in Windsor, Ontario, and, at the age of 22, became the first Olympic gold medalists from the city. He won a gold medal in the Small-bore Rifle, prone event at the 1956 Summer Olympics in Melbourne.

In 1952 he received the Lieutenant-Governor's Medal.

He joined the Canadian Forces in 1955, and served for over 20 years. His success at shooting began in his Army Cadet days when he won numerous Cadet shooting titles. In 1959, he was Canada's sporting rifle champion and also represented Canada for a second time at the 1968 Summer Olympics.

A 45-cent Canadian postage stamp portraying Ouellette was issued July 8, 1996, as part of the series Canadian Olympic Gold Medallists. He has also been inducted into Canada's Sports Hall of Fame.

Ouellete was killed when the aircraft he was flying crashed near Leamington, Ontario, on June 25, 1975.

References

1934 births
1975 deaths
Canadian male sport shooters
ISSF rifle shooters
Shooters at the 1956 Summer Olympics
Shooters at the 1968 Summer Olympics
Olympic shooters of Canada
Olympic gold medalists for Canada
Olympic medalists in shooting
Medalists at the 1956 Summer Olympics
Sportspeople from Windsor, Ontario
Aviators killed in aviation accidents or incidents in Canada
Accidental deaths in Ontario
Pan American Games medalists in shooting
Pan American Games gold medalists for Canada
Pan American Games silver medalists for Canada
Pan American Games bronze medalists for Canada
Shooters at the 1959 Pan American Games
Shooters at the 1967 Pan American Games
Victims of aviation accidents or incidents in 1975
20th-century Canadian people